Silvijo Čabraja (born 4 June 1968) is a Croatian professional football manager. He is currently manager of Croatian First Football League club Lokomotiva.

Playing career 
Čabraja passed through Lokomotiva youth system and represented Croatia on youth level alongside Zvonimir Boban, Robert Prosinečki and Davor Šuker. Later he won a transfer to then First division side NK Zagreb. However, Čabraja needed to pause his professional footballing career temporarily due to being diagnosed with Diabetes at the age of 20. He continued his career after two years of hiatus, this time at lower league sides before ending his playing career at NK Lučko at the age of 30.

Managerial career 
He started his coaching career at Hrvatski Dragovoljac youth system. After Ilija Lončarević was appointed president at Lokomotiva he hired him as a head coach, making him youngest head coach in senior football. Later he managed NK Zelina, NK Ponikve, NK Stupnik on a part-time contract. In 2008 he was appointed head of youth development at NK Lučko where he later took charge of senior team. After two spells with Druga HNL side NK Lučko from 2014 to 2016, he returned to Lokomotiva first as a head of youth development and in 2020 as a youth coach. On 8 June 2021 he was appointed head coach at Lokomotiva.

Personal life
While his time at Zelina, Ponikve and Stupnik he parallelly worked as a lingerie salesman. Čabraja hails from Novi Zagreb district, Siget neighbourhood.

Managerial statistics 

Managerial record by team and tenure

References

External links
 

1968 births
Living people
Sportspeople from Zagreb
Croatian football managers
NK Lokomotiva Zagreb managers
NK Lučko managers
Croatian Football League managers
People with diabetes